The Acarosporomycetidae are a subclass of fungi in the class Lecanoromycetes. This subclass contains the single order Acarosporales, which circumscribes the single family Acarosporaceae.

External links
Outline of Ascomycota 2007

Acarosporales
Lichen subclasses
Fungus subclasses
Taxa described in 2004